Pavel Estefan Bergaglio Cruz (born 1 March 2000) is an Italian professional footballer who plays as a defender for Cibao.

Career statistics

Club

Notes

References

2000 births
Living people
Italian footballers
Dominican Republic footballers
Association football defenders
Cibao FC players